Srđan Maksimović (born 13 December 1986) is a Serbian-Swiss professional football player. He usually plays as attacking right or central midfielder.

Club career
He came to Swiss Super League club BSC Young Boys in 2004 from the youth teams of the Serbian giants FK Crvena Zvezda, but he stayed only one season. Next he came back to Serbia where he signed with the Serbian Superliga club FK Rad. After one season, the club was relegated to the Serbian First League, the second tier in Serbia, and then he moved to another same level club in the winter break, FK Radnički Pirot, where he played until the end of that season. Next, he signed with another rising Serbian club, FK Sevojno from the town of Užice.

International career
He has played over 50 matches for the youth Switzerland national teams, beginning with the under-14 until the under-19.

External links
 Srđan Maksimović at Srbijafudbal
 Profile at Radnički Pirot official site

1986 births
Living people
People from Baden, Switzerland
Serbian footballers
Swiss men's footballers
Swiss expatriate footballers
BSC Young Boys players
FK Rad players
FK Radnički Pirot players
FK Sevojno players
German people of Serbian descent
Swiss people of Serbian descent
Swiss people of German descent
Association football midfielders
Sportspeople from Aargau